Clarice Christina Power is an Australian former international lawn bowler.

She was part of the fours team that won a silver medal at the 1986 Commonwealth Games in Edinburgh.

In 2017, she was inducted into the Sports Hall of Fame and has won four state championships.

References 

Australian female bowls players
Living people
Year of birth missing (living people)
Commonwealth Games silver medallists for Australia
Commonwealth Games medallists in lawn bowls
Bowls players at the 1986 Commonwealth Games
20th-century Australian women
Medallists at the 1986 Commonwealth Games